Perevozsky District is an administrative district (raion), one of the forty in Nizhny Novgorod Oblast, Russia. Municipally, it is incorporated as Perevozsky Municipal District. It is located in the southern central part of the oblast. Its administrative center is the town of Perevoz. Population: 16,519 (2010 Census);  The population of Perevoz accounts for 55.7% of the district's total population.

History
The district was established in 1935.

Notable residents 

Patriarch Nikon of Moscow (1605–1681), born in the village of Valmanovo
Sergey Safronov (1919–1983), aviator, Hero of the Soviet Union, born in Pilekshevo
Gennady Yanayev (1937–2010), Soviet politician, born in Perevoz

References

Notes

Sources

Districts of Nizhny Novgorod Oblast
States and territories established in 1935
